Martin Jarvis may refer to:
 Martin Jarvis (actor) (born 1941), British actor
 Martin Jarvis (conductor) (born 1951), Australian conductor and lecturer in music
 Chris Jarvis (presenter) (born 1970), née Martin Jarvis